Ken Skupski Jr. (born 9 April 1983) is a British former professional tennis player who specialised in doubles.

He reached his career-high ATP doubles ranking of world No. 44 in July 2010, and won seven titles on the ATP Tour, most notably the 2021 Mexican Open alongside younger brother Neal Skupski, with whom he regularly competed from 2013. Skupski is a three-time Grand Slam quarterfinalist, having reached this stage at the 2017 Wimbledon Championships in both men's and mixed doubles, and the 2020 Australian Open in men's doubles.

At the 2010 Commonwealth Games in Delhi, he won two medals representing England, silver in men's doubles with Ross Hutchins, and bronze in mixed doubles partnering Sarah Borwell. Skupski also represented Great Britain in the Davis Cup on two occasions in 2010.

Early and personal life
Ken Skupski was born in Liverpool. His father, Ken Sr. of Polish descent, is a retired police officer, his mother Mary is a golfer.

Skupski is a big fan of Liverpool Football Club and is a keen golfer who plays as often as he can and has a handicap of six.

As youngsters, the brothers once lost a game of doubles against a pairing with special educational and emotional needs, which they claim motivated them to train harder and which they attribute to their future success.

University tennis career

Skupski graduated from Louisiana State University in May 2007. NCAA Doubles finalist 2005 and Two-time Southeastern Conference Coaches Indoor Champion (only player in the history of the Southeastern Conference to win back-to-back titles). Fourth biggest winning player in the school's history with 107 wins. Six-time All-American (two Singles, one Doubles and three Academic).

Professional career

2004
Eight years after he was crowned Wimbledon champion, Richard Krajicek took on Skupski in an exhibition match in Liverpool. Skupski tied a closely contested clash one set all, then won a Super TieBreak 10–7.

2008
Skupski was looking for a fellow British doubles partner who was capable of going to the top of the game. Colin Fleming had turned pro in September and Skupski thought Fleming's game style suited his. Skupski took a bit of a hit because his ranking 250 was much higher than Fleming's at around 900, and so they came to play some low-level Futures and went on a great run.
The pair came to be known as 'Flemski'.

Fleming/Skupski won three Futures in Glasgow, London, Sunderland

 and the Caversham International Challenger in Jersey.

Ken Skupski finished the year there because he'd had a long year, but Fleming continued by partnering Jonny Marray in the Czech Republic and winning two Futures in  Frydland Nad Ostravici, and Opava

2009
In June 2009, Skupski and Colin Fleming beat the world no. 1 ranked doubles pair, Mike Bryan and Bob Bryan, at the Queen's Club grass court tournament. However he was out in the first round at Wimbledon for the second year in a row in five sets having led by two sets to love, again he partnered Fleming. He did however make into the second round of the mixed doubles losing in straight sets.

In September, the Davis Cup Captain John Lloyd announced that Skupski was part of the Great Britain Davis Cup squad for the Europe/Africa Zone Group 1 relegation play-off against Poland, Skupsi was acting as cover for any injuries and helping the team prepare for Poland's world top-10 ranked doubles team, but didn't play. Great Britain lost 3–2, and were relegated to Group II of the Davis Cup.

In September 2009 he won at the Open de Moselle in France. Again partnering Fleming they won 2–6, 6–4, 10–5, against the defending champion, Arnaud Clément and Michaël Llodra. Two months later they won their second title at the St Petersburg Open, defeating another French team of Jérémy Chardy and Richard Gasquet in the final in three sets 2–6, 7–5, 10–4.

2010
In January 2010, Skupski competed at his first Grand Slam outside of Wimbledon at the Australian Open. Again partnering Fleming they made it into the second before losing in three sets to Michael Kohlmann and Jarkko Nieminen 6–3, 4–6, 3–6. At the French Open he repeated his feat at the Australian open by losing in at the second  in three sets to fourth seeds Wesley Moodie and Dick Norman 6–7(5–7), 6–4, 6–7(4–7), again he partnered Fleming.

In June, Skupski reached the final of Eastbourne Open but lost in the final to Mariusz Fyrstenberg and Marcin Matkowski in three sets partnering Colin Fleming. Following his successful run at the Eastbourne Open he finally got a win at Wimbledon in the first round, but again lost in the second to the much more experienced and second seeds the Bryan brothers in straight sets, he was partnering Fleming. For the first time in his career he competed at all four Grand Slams in the same year, but at the US Open, Skupski and Fleming lost in the first round in straight sets.

The new Davis Cup Captain Leon Smith selected Skupski to take part in Great Britain's vital Davis Cup tie vs Turkey, at Eastbourne, in July alongside Colin Fleming, James Ward, Jamie Baker, and Alex Ward. Defeat would have meant Great Britain's relegation to Europe Zone Group III, the lowest tier of the competition. Skupski and Colin Fleming secured the 6–3, 6–4, 6–4 win that gave Britain an unassailable 3–0 lead, ending a run of five straight defeats, giving Great Britain a first Davis Cup win in three years.

In October, at the Commonwealth Games in Delhi, England's Skupski and Ross Hutchins won the Doubles Silver Medal, by losing to Australians Paul Hanley and Peter Luczak in the final.
A few days later, Skupski and Ross Hutchins were opponents in the Mixed Doubles, Skupski and Sarah Borwell beating Ross Hutchins and Anna Smith to win the Bronze Medal. Skupski and Borwell who had never played together ahead of the Indian event were brought together by their shared coach, Louis Cayer.

Following the Commonwealth Games, Skupski and Colin Fleming decided to end their partnership after a poor run of results. Their final tournament was St. Petersburg where they were beaten in the first round.

2011
In January at the Australian Open Skupski this time partnering Travis Parrott lost in the first round in straight sets. In February, Skupski partnered Robin Haase at the Marseille Open. They reached the final and won the title defeating Julien Benneteau and Jo-Wilfried Tsonga 6–3, 6–7(4–7), [13–11]. This was his first title in a year and a half. At the French Open, Skupski again lost in the first round in straight sets to his old partner Fleming 4–6, 4–6, this time he was partnering Igor Zelenay. At Wimbledon again he lost in the first round in straight sets, he was partnering Robin Haase, In Mixed Doubles, he partnered Elena Baltacha where they got to the second round but lost in straight sets to fifteenth seeds Andy Ram and Meghann Shaughnessy 4–6, 4–6.

2012
At the Australian Open in January, Skupski partnered Xavier Malisse where they lost in the first round in straight sets. This was Skupski's fifth first round exit in a row without taking a single set. In mid June, Skupski for the second time got to the final of Aegon International partnering Jamie Delgado, but lost to fellow Brits Colin Fleming and Ross Hutchins 4–6, 3–6. This was his first final in over a year. At Wimbledon, Skupski finally broke his grand slam curse by making it into the second round for the first time in two years after winning a grilling five setter in the first round. But unfortunately for Skupski and new doubles partner Jamie Delgado they faced the heavy task of the Bryan brothers. They were unable to defeat them and they lost in straight sets 6–7(2–7), 0–6, 2–6. He also competed in the mixed doubles event partnering Melanie South. They made it into the third round but were defeated by third seeds Nenad Zimonjić and Katarina Srebotnik in three tough sets 4–6, 7–6(7–5), 7–9. A month after Wimbledon, Skupski and Delgado got into their second final of the season at the Farmers Classic. They lost in three sets to Belgium duo Ruben Bemelmans and Xavier Malisse 6–7(5–7), 6–4, [10–7]. At the US Open Skupski, with full-time partner Jamie Delgado made it to the third round before losing to Spanish sixth seeds Marcel Granollers and Marc López in straight sets 2–6, 4–6. In the second round they defeated the defending champions Jürgen Melzer and Philipp Petzschner in straight sets.

2013
Although initially partnering with Delgado, Skupski increasingly played during 2013 with his brother Neal. Due to Neal's lower ranking, the pair played in a number of Futures and Challenger tournaments, winning six tournaments at the Challenger level. At the Kremlin Cup they entered their first ATP level tournament, reaching the final. At Grand Slam events, Skupski competed with some of his former partners, reaching the second round once again at Wimbledon, with Xavier Malisse.

2014
The Skupski brothers ranking as a partnership was not high enough to guarantee entry at the French Open, so they split to give themselves a better chance of qualifying. Ken partnered New Zealander Michael Venus, a fellow Louisiana State University alumni, while Neal teamed up with American Bradley Klahn, though they all lost in the first round.

2015
In July, Neal Skupski was busy playing World Team tennis in the US, so Skupski partnered Divij Sharan, clinching the doubles title in the Euro 42,500 men's Challenger tennis tournament, with a 4–6, 7-6(3), 10–6 victory over fourth seeds Ilija Bozoljac of Serbia and Flavio Cipolla of Italy, in Recanati, Italy.

In September, the Skupskis won the St. Remy Challenger title in France, only playing two matches in the event due to opening round byes and a Semi-Final walkover. There were just 23 sets and three match breakers in the entire doubles event. They were the top seeds and beat the second seeds Andrej Martin and Igor Zelenay in the final, 6–4, 6–1.

2017-2018: First Grand Slam doubles and mixed doubles quarterfinals, fourth ATP title
At the 2017 Wimbledon Championships he reached the quarterfinals as a wildcard for the first time in his career partnering with his brother Neal where they were defeated by 4th seeded pair Łukasz Kubot and Marcelo Melo.
At the same tournament he also reached the mixed doubles quarterfinals partnering with Jocelyn Rae.

The Skupski brothers won their first ATP title together at the Open Sud de France.

2020-2021: Second Grand Slam quarterfinal, First ATP 500 title
At the 2020 Australian Open Skupski reached the quarterfinals partnering Santiago González for the first time at this Major and second overall.

In March 2021, Skupski won his sixth ATP title and first at the ATP 500 level with his brother Neal at the Mexican Open.

In June, he also won Nottingham Open on grass, this time partnering Matt Reid.

At the end of the year, he won his second ATP title of the season, Sofia Open partnering Jonny O'Mara.

2022: Defending Nottingham Open title and retirement after Wimbledon
In June, at the beginning of the grass court season, partnering Jonny O'Mara, he defended his Nottingham Open title by beating Julian Cash and Henry Patten in the final after saving three championship points.
  
Skupski announced that Wimbledon 2022 was to be his last professional tournament. Partnering Jonny O'Mara again, he won the first round against Julio Peralta and Alejandro Tabilo. They won the second round against Marcelo Melo and Raven Klaasen. In the round of 16 they lost against 11th seeds from Germany Andreas Mies and Kevin Krawietz, which was the last match of his career. He was also scheduled to play Wimbledon mixed doubles with Heather Watson, but she pulled off before their first round match with a knee injury.

World TeamTennis
Skupski has played two seasons with World TeamTennis starting in 2017 when he debuted in the league with the Orange County Breakers and was named WTT's Male Rookie of the Year. In 2019 he joined the expansion Orlando Storm for their inaugural season. It was announced that he will rejoining the Orlando Storm during the 2020 season set to begin July 12, his second time with the team having also played in the previous season.

Skupski paired up with Tennys Sandgren in men's doubles during the season as well as Jessica Pegula in mixed doubles. Skupski earned a season high 56% of games won in men's doubles to help the Storm claim a No. 3 seed in the WTT Playoffs. The Storm would ultimately fall to the Chicago Smash in the semifinals.

ATP career finals

Doubles: 17 (7 titles, 10 runners-up)

ATP Challengers and ITF Futures finals

Singles: 2 (1–1)

Doubles: 77 (48–29)

Doubles performance timeline

References

External links
 
 
 

1983 births
Living people
English expatriate sportspeople in the United States
English people of Polish descent
Commonwealth Games bronze medallists for England
Commonwealth Games silver medallists for England
English male tennis players
LSU Tigers tennis players
Tennis players at the 2010 Commonwealth Games
Commonwealth Games medallists in tennis
British male tennis players
Tennis people from Merseyside
Sportspeople from Liverpool
Medallists at the 2010 Commonwealth Games